Bommarabettu Laxmijanardhana Santhosh is an Indian politician currently serving National General Secretary of Bharatiya Janata Party from 15 July 2019.

Santhosh worked as BJP's General Secretary (Organisation) for eight years in the Karnataka state unit and was appointed national joint general secretary in-charge of southern states in 2014 by Amit Shah.

Early life

Santhosh hails from Bommarabettu Grama Panchayat, Udupi District in Karnataka. He studied Instrumentation Technology in BDT College of Engineering in Davanagere, Karnataka.

Career
Santosh started as a RSS Pracharak (full-time worker) in 1993. He had stints in Mysuru, Shivamogga and later in Bangalore. He returned to Shivamogga in the early 2000s. In 2006 he moved to BJP as the General Secretary (Organization) for Karnataka. He remained in the post till 2014. This also saw the BJP in power between 2008 and 2013.

In 2014, Santosh was made the Joint General Secretary (Organization) of BJP. In 2019 he was elevated to the post General Secretary (Organization) of BJP. He is someone who is attributed to have spotted and groomed youth leaders such as Pratap Simha and Tejasvi Surya in Karnataka.

Detractors say Santosh wields a lot of control in Karnataka BJP and within the BJP high command at the center. People quote the fact that 2 unknown faces, Ashok Gasti and Eranna Kadadi, were made members of Rajya Sabha by the BJP in June 2020 much against the wishes of the Chief Minister.

Controversy
Santosh in January 2020 reported that Valmikis, Bhovis, Waddars,  and other Dalit societies are migrants, not native communities. J N Ganesh criticized him and said his assertion was incorrect. The Federation of Progressive Organizations organized a protest, demanding that he be charged under the SC/ST Act.

References

Bharatiya Janata Party politicians from Karnataka
Living people
1967 births